Bangladesh is currently competing in the 2019 South Asian Games in Kathmandu and Pokhara, Nepal from 1 to 10 December 2019.

Competitors 
The following is a list of the number of competitors representing Bangladesh that participated at the Games:

Medal tally

Athletics
A 24-member (14 men and 10 women) squad was announced for these Games.

Football
Bangladesh Football Federation (BFF) announced that they would not be sending a women's team to these Games.

Men's tournament

Group stage

References

Nations at the 2019 South Asian Games
2019